Ahmed Sudi, also known as Sudi-yi (or Ahmed-i) Bosnawi, was a 16th-century Bosnian commentator under the Ottoman Empire. He was the author of several Ottoman Turkish commentaries on Persian classics such as the Masnavi of Rumi, the Gulistan and Bostan of Saadi Shirazi, and The Divān of Hafez. According to Professor of Persian and Islamic studies Hamid Algar, Sudi is "perhaps the most prominent of all Ottoman Persianists".

Biography
Sudi was born at an unknown date in Sudići near Foča in eastern Bosnia (present-day Bosnia and Herzegovina). His place of birth provided for his nisba Sudi. The names of his parents and details of his relatives in general are unknown. Sudi probably received early education in Foča, but he then apparently moved to Sarajevo as attested by a reference in his Sherh-i Gulistan, a commentary on the Gulistan of Saadi Shirazi. Like others from Bosnia, Sudi then moved to Constantinople (present-day Istanbul) in order to pursue education. At the time of his arrival, fellow Bosnian Sokollu Mehmed Pasha was the Ottoman Grand Vizier. Sudi then moved to the east, visiting Erzurum, before heading to Amed (present-day Diyarbakir) in the Diyarbekir Eyalet, where he met the Sunni Iranian emigré Mosleh al-Din Lari (died 1571). Sudi subsequently studied Persian under Lari.

While Lari was mainly interested in the religious sciences, Sudi wanted to dedicate his time to Persian literature. He then travelled to Damascus in Ottoman Syria (where he read the Gulistan with Halim-e Shirvani) followed by the cities of Baghdad, Najaf and Kufa in the Ottoman provinces that make up present-day Iraq. Sudi also undertook the Hajj. Sudi provided comments on the places he visited, and complained "about an ignorance of Persian and good Arabic among the people of Baghdad". He also reported on the condition of the mosques and tombs of Kufa, which according to Sudi, were in ruins. He did not visit Iran itself, but during all of his travels, he tried to "widen his knowledge of Persian", not merely through contact with scholars, but also according to himself by discussing difficult passages of the works of the aforementioned Persian poets Hafez and Saadi with Iranian merchants (the latter being "men of both trade and learning").

Back in Constantinople, he continued his studies, before being appointed teacher at the Ibrahim Pasha madrasa. One of his students, Mostarli Dervish Pasha (died 1603) would later mention Sudi in the preface of his own Murad-name.

Works
In Constantinople, having returned from his travels in the east, Sudi started to write a series of commentaries in Ottoman Turkish on Persian classics such as the Masnavi of Rumi, the Gulistan (Sherh-i Gulistan) and Bostan of Saadi Shirazi, and The Divān of Hafez. Sudi's commentary on Hafez's divan was reportedly produced at the suggestion of Muhammad ibn Badr al-Din Muhyi'l-Din al-Munshi from Akhisar. The work was of such quality that it has remained relevant up to this day. His commentary on the Gulistan of Saadi remains the standard Turkish commentary. Burrill explains that Sudi's commentary on Hafez's divan outclasses that of Shem'i and Sürūrī, and it was used for editions by scholars of Persian and by Western orientalists.

Sudi in his Sherh-i Gulistan in many places criticizes the previous interpreters; one of the main targets of his critics is Shem'i. The commentary on Hafez was completed in Constantinople in 1594.

Personal life
Sudi remained unmarried. His date of death varies depending on source. The professor of Persian and Islamic studies Hamid Algar gave Sudi's date of death as 1591 in the Encyclopædia Iranica. The professor of Turkish studies Kathleen Burill stated in the second edition of the Encyclopaedia of Islam that Sudi's date of death ranges from 1592-3 to after 8 May 1598. Regarding his beliefs, she explained: It is known that Sudi is buried in Yusuf Pasha mosque in Aksaray but the exact place of his tombstone is not clear.

Notes

References

Sources

Further reading
 İnan, Murat Umut (2018). "Crossing Interpretive Boundaries in Sixteenth-Century Istanbul: Ahmed Sudi on the Divan of Hafiz of Shiraz". Philological Encounters 3, (2018), 275–309.
 İnan, Murat Umut (2012).  "Writing a Grammatical Commentary on Hafiz of Shiraz: A Sixteenth-century Ottoman Scholar on the Divan of Hafiz". PhD Dissertation.
 Kuru, Selim S.; İnan, Murat U. (2011). "Reintroducing Hafez to Readers in Rum: Sudi's Introduction to his Commentary on Hafez's Poetry Collection." Journal of Turkish Studies 35.1.

Academics from the Ottoman Empire
1598 deaths
Year of birth unknown
People from Čajniče
People from the Ottoman Empire of Bosnian descent
16th-century Bosnian people
Commentators
16th-century writers from the Ottoman Empire